Franklin Bicknell (20 March 1906 – 1964) M.D, M.R.C.P was a British physician, nutritionist and writer.

Biography

Bicknell was born at Great Amwell. He was the consulting physician for French Hospital, London. He practiced medicine at Wimpole Street. Bicknell was Chairman of the Food Education Society and a member of the Royal College of Physicians.

Bicknell co-authored Vitamins In Medicine in 1946 which was positively reviewed by the British Medical Journal as a "very fine work". The scholarly volume went through several editions and was positively reviewed by physician Paul S. Rhoads who noted that it was a comprehensive text written with skill and thoroughness. Bicknell argued for people to eat more dietary fats and meat. He advocated low-carbohydrate dieting and wrote the introduction for Richard Mackarness' book Eat Fat and Grow Slim in 1958.

Bicknell authored Chemicals in Food and in Farm Produce, in 1960. The book argued that birth defects both mental and physical are caused by alien substances added to foods. It was negatively reviewed in the British Journal of Industrial Medicine as scientifically misleading. A review in The Quarterly Review of Biology suggested that "while all will agree that we are against poisons in our foods, this volume contributes little to understanding how difficult it is at times to determine what is a poison."

Controversy

In 1947, Bicknell wrote a controversial article "Dying England" in The Medical Press supporting Albert Howard's idea that English people are malnourished. The article made sensationalist media headlines. Bicknell stated that "England is dying from starvation" and that the average person was only getting 2,100 calories a day when they needed 3,000. He believed the British population were suffering from prolonged chronic malnutrition. Bicknell ended his polemic with "once we were a great, a prosperous, a happy nation: once we were well fed."

Lord Woolton the appointed Minister of Food described Bicknell's claim as a "monstrous falsehood". He checked with the Ministry of Food and contradicted Bicknell's claim that the average person was getting 2,100 calories a day. The actual figure he stated, was 2,900. John Strachey commented that Bicknell had failed to take into account important factors such as the amount of food consumed in canteens and restaurants.

Selected publications

The Vitamins in Medicine (with Frederick Prescott, 1946)
The English Complaint or Your Fatigue and its Cure (1952)
Introduction Richard Mackarness. Eat Fat and Grow Slim (1958)
Enuresis or Bed-Wetting (1959)
Chemicals in Food and in Farm Produce: Their Harmful Effects (1960, 1961)

References

1906 births
1964 deaths
20th-century British medical doctors
British food writers
British health and wellness writers
British nutritionists
Dietitians
Low-carbohydrate diet advocates